Sonya Fe (born 1952) is an American painter.

Personal life
Fe is one of eight children born to Jewish-American mother Ruth Goldfein and father Joseph Williams who was Narragansett and Mexican-American. Her parents raised their eight children in downtown Los Angeles, California where Fe was encouraged to draw on the cement floors of their home.

At age 13 Fe won a scholarship to participate in a summer program at Otis College of Art and Design in Los Angeles. She has earned her B.A. degree from Art Center College of Design in Pasadena, California.

Work
Fe's work reflects social and cultural issues with themes centering on child abuse/neglect and the woman place in society. Fe admits "The figures themselves are not anatomically correct-some have little definition. However, the faces are very defined, making the face the center of attention. My main concern is clearly with the relationships among these women's varying physical presence and at the same time bringing into equilibrium the active lines, and the colors that define them."

Collections
National Museum of Mexican Art
Museo Del Barrio-New York, New York
Carnegie Museum-Oxnard, California
Morris Graves Museum-Eureka, California.
Museum of Contemporary Hispanic Art- New York, New York
San Diego Art Museum-San Diego, California
Smithsonian Museum-Washington D.C.

Notable exhibitions
2007 Orange County Contemporary Art Center OCCA-Orange County, California
2007 Studio 50, Inc-Los Angeles, California
2006 Piante Gallery-Eureka, California
2001-2005 Artist in Residence-Hoopa, California 
2000 University of the Pacific-Stockton, California
1999 California State Capitol-Sacramento, California
1998 Handsel Gallery-Santa Fe, New Mexico
1998 Self-Help Graphics- East Los Angeles
1997 University of California- La Verne, California
1995 Art Expo-New York, New York
1991 Galleria National-Monterey, Mexico
1990 World Print Faire-Tokyo, Japan
1989 JRS Gallery-Rhode Island
1989 Pierreos Gate-Manchester, Vermont
1988 New Masters-Miami, Florida
1988 Art Expo-New York, New York
1986 Sala 9-Barcelona, Spain
1983 Solar Art Gallery-San Diego, California
1982 Ojai Art Center-Ojai, California
1983 Velasquez Art Center-Ventura, California
1979 Alpha Contemporary Gallery-Los Angeles, California
1976 Mechicano Art Center-Los Angeles, California

References

External links
Official site

1952 births
Living people
Artists from Los Angeles
American women painters
Painters from California
21st-century American women artists